Gairnshiel Bridge is a road bridge that crosses the River Gairn in Aberdeenshire, Scotland.

The bridge was built the mid-18th century. It is Category A listed, having been upgraded from being B listed on 9 June 1994.

The bridge has been closed on numerous occasions due to damage from vehicular traffic. On 11 December 2020, planning permission was granted for a replacement bridge. Gairnshiel Bridge will be retained for use by pedestrians and cyclists.

References 

Road bridges in Scotland
18th-century establishments in Scotland
Bridges in Aberdeenshire
Category A listed buildings in Aberdeenshire
Listed bridges in Scotland